Navid Abdolmaleki (born 14 April 1990) is an Iranian mixed martial artist.
He is also a former karateka and He also has honors and medals in this field.

Karate career 
Navid Abdolmaleki has won several medals in World Karate Championships. The first Central Asian Games were held in Tashkent Uzbekistan with the participation of Iran, Uzbekistan, Kyrgyzstan, Kazakhstan, Afghanistan and Turkmenistan. Previously, Iran was in the West Asian region, But since 2017, with Navid Abdolmaleki winning gold medal at Central Asian Games, Iranian sports has entered Central Asia. In 2012, after years of hard work, he won the silver medal, gold medal and bronze medal at the Malaysia Kobe Osaka International Karate Championships. Navid Abdolmalki won one gold medal and two silver madals at International Karate Championships in India and Armenia 2009. He holds the bronze medal of the 2007 Kobe Osaka International Karate Championship in Malaysia Team Kumite and the silver medal of the 2007 International Karate Championship in Armenia (-80)Kg.

MMA career
In 2021, he joined the MMA sport and at first he was able to win in the mixed martial arts competitions of Belarus against opponents from Ukraine and Belarus.

References

External links
 
Fighters. Navid Abdolmaleki
Fighter. Navidi
Navid Abdolmaleki plans to compete at professional boxing
Abdolmaleki's superiority over the Belarusian fighter

1990 births
Living people
Iranian sportspeople in doping cases
Iranian male mixed martial artists
Sportspeople banned for life
Islamic Azad University alumni
Mixed martial artists utilizing Greco-Roman wrestling
Asian Games competitors for Iran
Medalists at the 2013 Summer Universiade
21st-century Iranian people